Arthur Stert (died 1755) of Membland, near Modbury, Devon was a British landowner and Whig politician who sat in the House of Commons from 1727 to 1754.
 
Stert's  family had been settled near Plympton, Devon, and in 1723 he purchased the estate of  Membland from the Champernowne family. He rebuilt the house with detached wings. 
 
Stert  had a small electoral  interest at Plymouth with the corporation. He was returned unopposed as Member of Parliament for Plymouth at the  1727 British general election  as a government supporter. In 1730 he was appointed a commissioner for settling the claims of merchants against Spain   under the Treaty of Seville.  He was responsible for assessing the compensation payable to them, and was examined on them  by the House of Commons. He was returned again for Plymouth in 1734 and  1741. He lost his post after the fall of Walpole in 1742 but was recommended by Walpole   to Pelham who obtained a   secret service pension for him and used him in west country elections. He was returned unopposed again at the 1747 British general election but did not stand in 1754.

Stert died on 2 February1755. He married but was predeceased by his only son, leaving two daughters.

References

1755 deaths

Year of birth missing
Members of the Parliament of Great Britain for Plymouth
British MPs 1727–1734
British MPs 1734–1741
British MPs 1741–1747
British MPs 1747–1754